Elections to the Baseball Hall of Fame for 1953 followed a radically new procedure. The institution appointed its Committee on Baseball Veterans, the famous "Veterans Committee", to meet in person and consider pioneers and executives, managers, umpires, and earlier major league players. Committees in the 1930s and 1940s had chosen several pioneers and executives, but this was the first direction of anyone's attention to field personnel other than players, the managers and umpires.

The first Veterans Committee met in closed sessions and elected six people: Ed Barrow, Chief Bender, Tommy Connolly, Bill Klem, Bobby Wallace, and Harry Wright. The Baseball Writers' Association of America (BBWAA) voted by mail, per usual, to select from recent players and elected two, Dizzy Dean and Al Simmons. A formal induction ceremony was held in Cooperstown, New York, on July 27, 1953, with Commissioner of Baseball Ford Frick in attendance.

BBWAA election 
The 10-year members of the BBWAA had the authority to select any players active in 1928 or later, provided they had not been active in 1952. Voters were instructed to cast votes for 10 candidates; any candidate receiving votes on at least 75% of the ballots would be honored with induction to the Hall.

A total of 264 ballots were cast in the Baseball Writers Election, with 2,525 individual votes for 83 specific candidates, an average of 9.56 per ballot; 198 votes were required for election. The two candidates who received at least 75% of the vote and were elected are indicated in bold italics; those candidates who were selected in subsequent elections are indicated in italics.

The rules at the time indicated that players were eligible if they had been out of baseball for at least one season, so this was Joe DiMaggio's first season of eligibility, as he had retired after the 1951 season.

Veterans Committee
By 1953, the Old-Timers Committee had not met for seven years (1946), and had only elected two players by mail, Mordecai Brown and Kid Nichols. They had not elected any non-players since the mass induction of 1945, and no players whose careers had begun before 1890 since the election of 1946.

In response to this and the Old-Timers Committee members' increasing ages, a new "Committee on Baseball Veterans" (commonly known as the Veterans Committee) was created, consisting of:
 J. G. Taylor Spink, publisher of The Sporting News from 1914 to 1962, Chairman of the Committee
 Paul Kerr, director of the Clark Foundation which funded the Hall, and future President of the Baseball Hall of Fame
 American League President Will Harridge
 National League President and former General Manager of the Cincinnati Reds Warren Giles
 Branch Rickey, who helped pioneer the farm system as General Manager of the St. Louis Cardinals, signed Jackie Robinson who broke the color barrier as General Manager of the Brooklyn Dodgers, and was at this time active General Manager of the Pittsburgh Pirates
 President of the International League Frank Shaughnessy
 Hall of Fame second baseman Charlie Gehringer
 sportswriter Warren Brown, who, among other things, is credited with giving Babe Ruth the nickname "The Sultan of Swat"
 sportswriter Frank Graham of the New York Journal-American
 sportswriter and former BBWAA President John Malaney of The Boston Post
 former sportswriter and then secretary-treasurer of the National League Charlie Segar

The first Veterans Committee met in closed sessions and elected six people: Ed Barrow, Chief Bender, Tommy Connolly, Bill Klem, Bobby Wallace, and Harry Wright. Afterwards, the Veterans Committee was limited to two selections per meeting. It was also decided in 1953 that the new Veterans Committee would meet only in odd-numbered years. On July 22, 1956, it was decided that the BBWAA would vote only in even-numbered years.

Of the 11 members of the Veterans Committee, Charlie Gehringer had already been inducted in the Hall as a player in 1949; Branch Rickey would be inducted as an executive/pioneer in 1967, Will Harridge would be inducted as an executive in 1972, and Warren Giles would be inducted as an executive in 1979. Additionally, J. G. Taylor Spink (1962), Frank Graham (1971) and Warren Brown (1973) would be honored with the J. G. Taylor Spink Award.

References

External links
1953 Election at www.baseballhalloffame.org

Baseball Hall of Fame balloting
1953 in baseball